LG ThinQ (pronounced as "think-cue"; sometimes known as LG SmartThinQ) is a brand launched by LG Electronics in 2017, featuring products that are equipped with voice control and artificial intelligence technology. The brand was originally launched for home appliances and consumer electronics, such as refrigerators and air conditioners. In February 2018, LG announced the LG V30S ThinQ, which is the first phone to have the "ThinQ" branding.

History 

The branding was first introduced in 2011 in the Consumer Electronics Show (CES) in Las Vegas as THINQ. The first ThinQ product was a smart refrigerator, with features such as smart savings options, food management system, and different software in the LCD screen on the fridge.

The unified branding was then officially launched as ThinQ at CES 2017 as an artificial intelligence-based brand for all their smart products.

Features 
LG ThinQ products use voice control to interact with users, and use sensor data and different features such as product recognition and learning engine technologies to enhance their abilities.

Deep ThinQ (or LG ThinQ AI) was introduced as LG's own AI platform. It was reported that it could engage in two way conversations with users and could educate itself according to users' behaviour patterns and habits.

In 2018, LG ThinQ-branded TVs added support for Google Assistant and Alexa voice commands.

As of August 30, 2018, LG's ThinQ products now communicate with each other for tasks such as going to an event or following a recipe. They have sensors for communicating with other ThinQ devices and appliances.

Products 
Smartphones
 LG V30S ThinQ
 LG V35 ThinQ
 LG G7 ThinQ
 LG V40 ThinQ
 LG G8 ThinQ
 LG G8s ThinQ
 LG G8x
ThinQ
 LG V50 ThinQ 5G
 LG G6 ThinQ

References

External links 
 

LG Electronics
Natural language processing software